Little Brother is a 1927 Soviet silent comedy film directed by Grigori Kozintsev and Leonid Trauberg. The film is believed to be lost.

Cast
 Emil Gal as Worker of the port
 Sergey Gerasimov
 Tatyana Guretskaya as Conductor
 Andrei Kostrichkin
 Sergey Martinson
 Valeri Plotnikov
 Pyotr Sobolevsky
 Yanina Zhejmo

External links

1927 films
1927 comedy films
Soviet comedy films
Russian comedy films
Lenfilm films
Soviet black-and-white films
Soviet silent feature films
Lost Russian films
Films directed by Grigori Kozintsev
Films directed by Leonid Trauberg
Lost comedy films
Russian black-and-white films
Lost Soviet films
Silent comedy films